The Organized Crime Control Act of 1970 (October 15, 1970), was an Act of Congress sponsored by Democratic Senator John L. McClellan and signed into law by U.S. President Richard Nixon. 

The Act was the product of two sets of hearings in the Senate, the Select Committee on Improper Activities in Labor and Management hearings of 1957-1959 and the McClellan hearings of 1962-1964.

The Act prohibits the creation or management of a gambling organization involving five or more people if it has been in business more than 30 days or accumulates $2,000 in gross revenue in a single day. It also gave grand juries new powers, permitted detention of unmanageable witnesses, and gave the U.S. Attorney General authorization to protect witnesses, both state and federal, and their families. This last measure helped lead to the creation of WITSEC, an acronym for witness security.

Part of the Act created the Racketeer Influenced and Corrupt Organizations Act. 

It is not to be confused with New York's Organized Crime Control Act of 1986, which is also called OCCA and is sometimes referred to as "Little RICO" or "Baby RICO".

References

United States federal criminal legislation
Organized crime in the United States
1970 in law
91st United States Congress
Acts related to organized crime